Theretra lifuensis is a moth of the  family Sphingidae. It is known from the Loyalty Islands.

The length of the forewings is 33.8-37.3 mm for males and about 40.1 mm for females. It is similar to Theretra clotho celata but distinguishable by the pink tone of the median band of the hindwing upperside. The forewing is less elongated and the outer margin is more convex. The forewing upperside is also similar to Theretra clotho celata but the ground colour is darker and more grey, the discal spot is clearly evident and there is a scalloped olive-green band present distal to the fourth postmedian line. The hindwing upperside has a pale median band distinctly tinged pink, especially in females.

References

Theretra
Moths described in 1894